The 2009–10 Cleveland Cavaliers season was the 40th season of the franchise in the National Basketball Association (NBA). The Cavaliers finished with the best record in the NBA at 61–21, earning them first place in the East. The season saw LeBron James win the MVP Award for the second straight year. The Cavaliers had the fifth best team offensive rating in the NBA.

After defeating the Derrick Rose-led Chicago Bulls in the first round in five games, the Cavs faced the 4th-seeded Boston Celtics in the Semifinals in a rematch of the 2008 Conference Semifinals where the Celtics won in seven games. The Cavaliers were favored to beat them, but lost in six games despite being up 2-1. The Celtics would advance to the NBA Finals and lose to the Los Angeles Lakers in seven games. Following the season, Danny Ferry stepped down as general manager, head coach Mike Brown was fired, James signed as a free agent with the Miami Heat, but would return to the Cavaliers in 2014, Shaquille O'Neal signed as a free agent with the Boston Celtics, which turned out to be O'Neal's final season as a player, and Zydrunas Ilgauskas also left the team to join one season with the Miami Heat before retiring.

After LeBron's departure, the Cavaliers struggled greatly without him for four seasons, and entered a state of rebuilding. The Cavaliers would not make the playoffs again until 2015, when LeBron returned to the Cavaliers, who drafted All-Star Kyrie Irving and traded for All-Star Kevin Love.

As of 2022, this was the last time that the Cavaliers have won 60 or more games.

Key dates

 June 25 – The 2009 NBA draft took place in New York City. The Cavs also acquire Shaquille O'Neal, in a trade with the Phoenix Suns.
 July 8 – The free agency period started.
 July 13 – The Cavs sign with Anthony Parker.
 July 19 – Jamario Moon signs with the Cleveland Cavaliers.
 August 12 – The Cavaliers sign with Leon Powe.
 October 6 – The Cavs open the Pre-Season, with a victory over the Charlotte Bobcats, in The Q.
 October 21 – The Cavs close the Pre-Season, losing to the Boston Celtics, in the Value City Arena.
 October 27 – The Cleveland Cavaliers open the Regular Season, and are defeated by the Boston Celtics, in Quicken Loans Arena.
 February 17 – The Cavs acquire Antawn Jamison and Sebastian Telfair, in a three-team trade, with the Washington Wizards and the Los Angeles Clippers.
 March 17 – The Cavaliers clinched the Central Division title for the second straight year, and the third time in franchise history.
 March 23 – The Cavs waive Darnell Jackson and sign with Žydrūnas Ilgauskas.
 April 2 – The Cavaliers clinched best record in the Eastern Conference for the second straight year, and the second time in franchise history.
 April 4 – The Cavaliers clinched the best record in the league, and thus home court advantage throughout the playoffs for the second straight year, and the second time in franchise history.
 April 14 – The Cavs close the Regular Season, with a loss against the Atlanta Hawks and a 61–21 record.
 April 17 – The Cleveland Cavaliers open the First Round of the Playoffs, with a 96-83 victory, over the Chicago Bulls, in The Q.
 April 27 – The Cavaliers close the First Round Series at 4–1, with a 96–94 victory over the Bulls, in The Q.
 May 1 – The Cavs open the Eastern Conference Semifinals, with a 101–93 victory, over the Celtics, in the Quicken Loans Arena.
 May 13- The Cavaliers lose in the Eastern Conference Semifinals, at 4–2 to the underdog Boston Celtics.
 May 24 – Head Coach Mike Brown was fired.

Draft picks

Roster

Pre-season

|- align="center" bgcolor="#ccffcc"
| 1 || October 6 || Charlotte Bobcats || 87 – 92 || || || || Quicken Loans Arena20,403 || 1-0  recap
|- align="center" bgcolor="#ccffcc"
| 2 || October 10 || @Charlotte Bobcats || 102 – 96 || || || || North Charleston Coliseum11,489 ||2-0  recap
|- align="center" bgcolor="#ccffcc"
| 3 || October 12 || Olympiacos Piraeus (Greece) || 94 – 111 || || || ||  Quicken Loans Arena19,791  ||3-0 recap
|- align="center" bgcolor="#ffbbbb"
| 4 || October 14 || Washington Wizards || 109 – 104 || || || || Quicken Loans Arena19,672 || 3-1 recap
|- align="center" bgcolor="#ffbbbb"
| 5 || October 16 || @San Antonio Spurs || 98 – 105 || || || || AT&T Center17,186 || 3-2 recap
|- align="center" bgcolor="#ffbbbb"
| 6 || October 17 || @Dallas Mavericks || 82 – 93 || || || || American Airlines Center18,525 || 3-3 recap
|- align="center" bgcolor="#ccffcc"
| 7 || October 20 || Dallas Mavericks || 66 – 96 || || || || Petersen Events Center10,011 || 4-3 recap
|- align="center" bgcolor="#ffbbbb"
| 8 || October 21 || Boston Celtics || 96 – 82 || || ||  ||Value City Arena18,021 || 4-4 recap
|-

Regular season

Standings

Record vs. opponents

Game log

|- align="center" bgcolor="#ffcccc"
| 1
| October 27
| Boston
| 
| LeBron James (38)
| Shaquille O'Neal (10)
| LeBron James (8)
| Quicken Loans Arena20,562
| 0–1
|- align="center" bgcolor="#ffcccc"
| 2
| October 28
| @ Toronto
| 
| LeBron James (23)
| LeBron James (11)
| LeBron James (12)
| Air Canada Centre20,152
| 0–2
|- align="center" bgcolor="#ccffcc"
| 3
| October 30
| @ Minnesota
| 
| LeBron James (24)
| Anderson Varejão (11)
| LeBron James, Mo Williams (6)
| Target Center19,356
| 1–2
|- align="center" bgcolor="#ccffcc"
| 4
| October 31
| Charlotte
| 
| Mo Williams (24)
| Anderson Varejão (8)
| LeBron James (9)
| Quicken Loans Arena20,562
| 2–2

|- align="center" bgcolor="#ccffcc"
| 5
| November 3
| Washington
| 
| LeBron James (27)
| Anderson Varejão (10)
| LeBron James, Mo Williams (6)
| Quicken Loans Arena20,562
| 3-2
|- align="center" bgcolor="#ffcccc"
| 6
| November 5
| Chicago
| 
| LeBron James (25)
| Anderson Varejão (13)
| LeBron James, Mo Williams (6)
| Quicken Loans Arena20,562
| 3–3
|- align="center" bgcolor="#ccffcc"
| 7
| November 6
| @ New York
| 
| LeBron James (33)
| Anderson Varejão (14)
| LeBron James (9)
| Madison Square Garden19,763
| 4–3
|- align="center" bgcolor="#ccffcc"
| 8
| November 11
| @ Orlando
| 
| LeBron James (36)
| LeBron James (8)
| Mo Williams (6)
| Amway Arena17,461
| 5–3
|- align="center" bgcolor="#ccffcc"
| 9
| November 12
| @ Miami
| 
| LeBron James (34)
| Jamario Moon (6)
| LeBron James (7)
| American Airlines Arena19,600
| 6–3
|- align="center" bgcolor="#ccffcc"
| 10
| November 14
| Utah
| 
| LeBron James, Mo Williams (21)
| LeBron James, Zydrunas Ilgauskas (6)
| LeBron James (9)
| Quicken Loans Arena20,562
| 7–3
|- align="center" bgcolor="#ccffcc"
| 11
| November 17
| Golden State
| 
| LeBron James (31)
| J.J. Hickson (9)
| LeBron James (12)
| Quicken Loans Arena20,562
| 8–3
|- align="center" bgcolor="#ffcccc"
| 12
| November 18
| @ Washington
| 
| LeBron James (34)
| Zydrunas Ilgauskas (9)
| LeBron James (8)
| Verizon Center20,173
| 8–4
|- align="center" bgcolor="#ccffcc"
| 13
| November 20
| @ Indiana
| 
| LeBron James (40)
| Zydrunas Ilgauskas (11)
| LeBron James (7)
| Conseco Fieldhouse18,165
| 9–4
|- align="center" bgcolor="#ccffcc"
| 14
| November 21
| Philadelphia
| 
| LeBron James (32)
| Zydrunas Ilgauskas (8)
| LeBron James (9)
| Quicken Loans Arena20,562
| 10–4
|- align="center" bgcolor="#ccffcc"
| 15
| November 25
| @ Detroit
| 
| LeBron James (34)
| LeBron James, Anderson Varejão (8)
| Mo Williams (8)
| The Palace of Auburn Hills22,076
| 11–4
|- align="center" bgcolor="#ffcccc"
| 16
| November 27
| @ Charlotte
| 
| LeBron James (25)
| Anderson Varejão (11)
| Mo Williams (6)
| Time Warner Cable Arena 19,168
| 11–5
|- align="center" bgcolor="#ccffcc"
| 17
| November 28
| Dallas
| 
| LeBron James, Mo Williams (25)
| Jamario Moon, Anderson Varejão (9)
| LeBron James (12)
| Quicken Loans Arena 20,562
| 12–5

|- align="center" bgcolor="#ccffcc"
| 18
| December 2
| Phoenix
| 
| Zydrunas Ilgauskas (14)
| Shaquille O'Neal (9)
| LeBron James (10)
| Quicken Loans Arena20,562
| 13–5
|- align="center" bgcolor="#ccffcc"
| 19
| December 4
| Chicago
| 
| LeBron James (23)
| Zydrunas Ilgauskas, Shaquille O'Neal (7)
| LeBron James (11)
| Quicken Loans Arena20,562
| 14–5
|- align="center" bgcolor="#ccffcc"
| 20
| December 6
| @ Milwaukee
| 
| Delonte West (21)
| Anderson Varejão (12)
| LeBron James (10)
| Bradley Center16,625
| 15–5
|- align="center" bgcolor="#ffcccc"
| 21
| December 8
| @ Memphis
| 
| LeBron James (43)
| LeBron James (13)
| Mo Williams (8)
| FedEx Forum16,325
| 15–6
|- align="center" bgcolor="#ffcccc"
| 22
| December 9
| @ Houston
| 
| LeBron James (27)
| Shaquille O'Neal, J. J. Hickson (10)
| LeBron James (7)
| Toyota Center18,200
| 15–7
|- align="center" bgcolor="#ccffcc"
| 23
| December 11
| Portland
| 
| LeBron James (33)
| Shaquille O'Neal (11)
| Mo Williams (10)
| Quicken Loans Arena20,562
| 16–7
|- align="center" bgcolor="#ccffcc"
| 24
| December 13
| @ Oklahoma City
| 
| LeBron James (44)
| Anderson Varejão (10)
| LeBron James (6)
| Ford Center18,203
| 17–7
|- align="center" bgcolor="#ccffcc"
| 25
| December 15
| New Jersey
| 
| LeBron James (23)
| Mo Williams, Jamario Moon (8)
| LeBron James (7)
| Quicken Loans Arena20,562
| 18–7
|- align="center" bgcolor="#ccffcc"
| 26
| December 16
| @ Philadelphia
| 
| LeBron James (36)
| Shaquille O'Neal (9)
| LeBron James (7)
| Wachovia Center19,517
| 19–7
|- align="center" bgcolor="#ccffcc"
| 27
| December 18
| Milwaukee
| 
| LeBron James (26)
| LeBron James (10)
| LeBron James (8)
| Quicken Loans Arena20,562
| 20–7
|- align="center" bgcolor="#ffcccc"
| 28
| December 20
| @ Dallas
| 
| LeBron James (25)
| Anderson Varejão, Shaquille O'Neal (8)
| LeBron James (6)
| American Airlines Center20,346
| 20–8
|- align="center" bgcolor="#ccffcc"
| 29
| December 21
| @ Phoenix
| 
| LeBron James (29)
| Mo Williams, LeBron James, J.J. Hickson (6)
| Delonte West (6)
| US Airways Center18,221
| 21–8
|- align="center" bgcolor="#ccffcc"
| 30
| December 23
| @ Sacramento
| 
| LeBron James (34)
| LeBron James (16)
| LeBron James (10)
| ARCO Arena16,407
| 22–8
|- align="center" bgcolor="#ccffcc"
| 31
| December 25
| @ L.A. Lakers
| 
| Mo Williams (28)
| Anderson Varejão, Zydrunas Ilgauskas (9)
| LeBron James (9)
| Staples Center18,997
| 23–8
|- align="center" bgcolor="#ccffcc"
| 32
| December 27
| Houston
| 
| LeBron James (29)
| Shaquille O'Neal (11)
| LeBron James (6)
| Quicken Loans Arena20,562
| 24–8
|- align="center" bgcolor="#ccffcc"
| 33
| December 29
| @ Atlanta
| 
| Mo Williams (20)
| LeBron James, Anderson Varejão, Shaquille O'Neal (8)
| LeBron James (10)
| Philips Arena20,150
| 25–8
|- align="center" bgcolor="#ccffcc"
| 34
| December 30
| Atlanta
| 
| LeBron James (48)
| LeBron James (10)
| Mo Williams (10)
| Quicken Loans Arena20,562
| 26–8

|- align="center" bgcolor="#ccffcc"
| 35
| January 2
| @ New Jersey
| 
| LeBron James (28)
| Anderson Varejão (12)
| LeBron James (7)
| Izod Center17,569
| 27–8
|- align="center" bgcolor="#ffcccc"
| 36
| January 3
| Charlotte
| 
| LeBron James (29)
| LeBron James, Shaquille O'Neal (7)
| LeBron James, Mo Williams (6)
| Quicken Loans Arena20,562
| 27–9
|- align="center" bgcolor="#ccffcc"
| 37
| January 6
| Washington
| 
| LeBron James (23)
| Anderson Varejão, Zydrunas Ilgauskas (8)
| LeBron James (8)
| Quicken Loans Arena20,562
| 28–9
|- align="center" bgcolor="#ffcccc"
| 38
| January 8
| @ Denver
| 
| LeBron James (35)
| Anderson Varejão (15)
| LeBron James (7)
| Pepsi Center19,996
| 28–10
|- align="center" bgcolor="#ccffcc"
| 39
| January 10
| @ Portland
| 
| LeBron James (41)
| Shaquille O'Neal (11)
| LeBron James (8)
| Rose Garden Arena20,614
| 29–10
|- align="center" bgcolor="#ccffcc"
| 40
| January 11
| @ Golden State
| 
| LeBron James (37)
| Anderson Varejão, Zydrunas Ilgauskas (9)
| LeBron James (11)
| Oracle Arena19,596
| 30–10
|- align="center" bgcolor="#ffcccc"
| 41
| January 14
| @ Utah
| 
| LeBron James (36)
| LeBron James, Anderson Varejão (9)
| LeBron James (6)
| EnergySolutions Arena19,911
| 30–11
|- align="center" bgcolor="#ccffcc"
| 42
| January 16
| @ L.A. Clippers
| 
| LeBron James (32)
| Anderson Varejão (9)
| Mo Williams (6)
| Staples Center19,277
| 31–11
|- align="center" bgcolor="#ccffcc"
| 43
| January 19
| Toronto
| 
| LeBron James (28)
| LeBron James (9)
| LeBron James (11)
| Quicken Loans Arena20,562
| 32–11
|- align="center" bgcolor="#ccffcc"
| 44
| January 21
| L.A. Lakers
| 
| LeBron James (37)
| J.J. Hickson (14)
| LeBron James (9)
| Quicken Loans Arena20,562
| 33–11
|- align="center" bgcolor="#ccffcc"
| 45
| January 23
| Oklahoma City
| 
| LeBron James (37)
| LeBron James, J.J. Hickson (9)
| LeBron James (12)
| Quicken Loans Arena20,562
| 34–11
|- align="center" bgcolor="#ccffcc"
| 46
| January 25
| @ Miami
| 
| LeBron James (32)
| Anderson Varejão (10)
| LeBron James (4)
| AmericanAirlines Arena19,600
| 35–11
|- align="center" bgcolor="#ccffcc"
| 47
| January 27
| Minnesota
| 
| J.J. Hickson (23)
| Anderson Varejão (10)
| LeBron James (11)
| Quicken Loans Arena20,562
| 36–11
|- align="center" bgcolor="#ccffcc"
| 48
| January 29
| @ Indiana
| 
| LeBron James, Shaquille O'Neal (22)
| LeBron James, Anderson Varejão (9)
| LeBron James (13)
| Conseco Fieldhouse18,165
| 37–11
|- align="center" bgcolor="#ccffcc"
| 49
| January 31
| L.A. Clippers
| 
| LeBron James (32)
| Shaquille O'Neal (12)
| LeBron James (11)
| Quicken Loans Arena20,562
| 38–11

|- align="center" bgcolor="#ccffcc"
| 50
| February 2
| Memphis
| 
| LeBron James (22)
| Shaquille O'Neal (13)
| LeBron James (15)
| Quicken Loans Arena20,562
| 39–11
|- align="center" bgcolor="#ccffcc"
| 51
| February 4
| Miami
| 
| LeBron James (36)
| Shaquille O'Neal (8)
| LeBron James (8)
| Quicken Loans Arena20,562
| 40–11
|- align="center" bgcolor="#ccffcc"
| 52
| February 6
| New York
| 
| LeBron James (47)
| LeBron James (8)
| LeBron James (8)
| Quicken Loans Arena20,562
| 41–11
|- align="center" bgcolor="#ccffcc"
| 53
| February 9
| New Jersey
| 
| LeBron James (32)
| Anderson Varejão (9)
| LeBron James (11)
| Quicken Loans Arena20,562
| 42–11
|- align="center" bgcolor="#ccffcc"
| 54
| February 11
| Orlando
| 
| LeBron James (32)
| LeBron James (8)
| LeBron James (13)
| Quicken Loans Arena20,562
| 43–11
|- align="center"
|colspan="9" bgcolor="#bbcaff"|All-Star Break
|- align="center" bgcolor="#ffcccc"
| 55
| February 18
| Denver
| 
| LeBron James (43)
| LeBron James (13)
| LeBron James (15)
| Quicken Loans Arena20,562
| 43–12
|- align="center" bgcolor="#ffcccc"
| 56
| February 19
| @ Charlotte
| 
| LeBron James (22)
| J.J. Hickson, Shaquille O'Neal, Antawn Jamison (7)
| LeBron James (9)
| Time Warner Cable Arena19,568
| 43–13
|- align="center" bgcolor="#ffcccc"
| 57
| February 21
| @ Orlando
| 
| LeBron James (33)
| LeBron James (9)
| LeBron James (6)
| Amway Arena17,461
| 43–14
|- align="center" bgcolor="#ccffcc"
| 58
| February 23
| New Orleans
| 
| LeBron James, Shaquille O'Neal (20)
| LeBron James (13)
| Shaquille O'Neal, Anderson Varejão (7)
| Quicken Loans Arena20,562
| 44–14
|- align="center" bgcolor="#ccffcc"
| 59
| February 25
| @ Boston
| 
| LeBron James (36)
| Anderson Varejão (10)
| LeBron James (9)
| TD Garden18,624
| 45–14
|- align="center" bgcolor="#ccffcc"
| 60
| February 26
| @ Toronto
| 
| LeBron James (36)
| Antawn Jamison (11)
| LeBron James (9)
| Air Canada Centre20,107
| 46–14

|- align="center" bgcolor="#ccffcc"
| 61
| March 1
| New York
| 
| LeBron James (22)
| Antawn Jamison (12)
| Mo Williams (10)
| Quicken Loans Arena20,562
| 47–14
|- align="center" bgcolor="#ccffcc"
| 62
| March 3
| @ New Jersey
| 
| LeBron James (26)
| J. J. Hickson (13)
| LeBron James (14)
| Izod Center17,502
| 48–14
|- align="center" bgcolor="#ccffcc"
| 63
| March 5
| Detroit
| 
| LeBron James (40)
| LeBron James (13)
| Delonte West (7)
| Quicken Loans Arena20,562
| 49–14
|- align="center" bgcolor="#ffcccc"
| 64
| March 6
| @ Milwaukee
| 
| Antawn Jamison (30)
| Antawn Jamison (11)
| Delonte West (6)
| Bradley Center18,717
| 49–15
|- align="center" bgcolor="#ccffcc"
| 65
| March 8
| San Antonio
| 
| Antawn Jamison, Mo Williams (17)
| Anderson Varejão (9)
| Mo Williams (8)
| Quicken Loans Arena20,562
| 50–15
|- align="center" bgcolor="#ccffcc"
| 66
| March 12
| @ Philadelphia
| 
| LeBron James (23)
| Anderson Varejão (12)
| LeBron James (10)
| Wachovia Center20,433
| 51–15
|- align="center" bgcolor="#ccffcc"
| 67
| March 14
| Boston
| 
| LeBron James (30)
| Antawn Jamison (12)
| LeBron James (7)
| Quicken Loans Arena20,562
| 52–15
|- align="center" bgcolor="#ccffcc"
| 68
| March 16
| @ Detroit
| 
| LeBron James (29)
| LeBron James (12)
| LeBron James (12)
| The Palace of Auburn Hills22,076
| 53–15
|- align="center" bgcolor="#ccffcc"
| 69
| March 17
| Indiana
| 
| LeBron James (32)
| LeBron James, Antawn Jamison (9)
| LeBron James (9)
| Quicken Loans Arena20,562
| 54–15
|- align="center" bgcolor="#ccffcc"
| 70
| March 19
| @ Chicago
| 
| LeBron James (29)
| LeBron James (11)
| LeBron James (7)
| United Center23,129
| 55–15
|- align="center" bgcolor="#ccffcc"
| 71
| March 21
| Detroit
| 
| Leon Powe (16)
| Anderson Varejão (9)
| Mo Williams (8)
| Quicken Loans Arena20,562
| 56–15
|- align="center" bgcolor="#ccffcc"
| 72
| March 24
| @ New Orleans
| 
| LeBron James (38)
| Antawn Jamison (11)
| LeBron James (9)
| New Orleans Arena18,008
| 57–15
|- align="center" bgcolor="#ffcccc"
| 73
| March 26
| @ San Antonio
| 
| LeBron James (27)
| Antawn Jamison (9)
| LeBron James (10)
| AT&T Center18,581
| 57–16
|- align="center" bgcolor="#ccffcc"
| 74
| March 28
| Sacramento
| 
| LeBron James (34)
| Antawn Jamison (9)
| LeBron James (8)
| Quicken Loans Arena20,562
| 58–16
|- align="center" bgcolor="#ccffcc"
| 75
| March 31
| Milwaukee
| 
| LeBron James (23)
| Antawn Jamison (12)
| LeBron James (7)
| Quicken Loans Arena20,562
| 59–16

|- align="center" bgcolor="#ccffcc"
| 76
| April 2
| Atlanta
| 
| LeBron James (27)
| J. J. Hickson (16)
| LeBron James (6)
| Quicken Loans Arena20,562
| 60–16
|- align="center" bgcolor="#ffcccc"
| 77
| April 4
| @ Boston
| 
| LeBron James (42)
| J. J. Hickson (11)
| LeBron James (9)
| TD Garden18,624
| 60–17
|- align="center" bgcolor="#ccffcc"
| 78
| April 6
| Tornto
| 
| Antawn Jamison (20)
| Anthony Parker (8)
| LeBron James (13)
| Quicken Loans Arena20,562
| 61–17
|- align="center" bgcolor="#ffcccc"
| 79
| April 8
| @ Chicago
| 
| Mo Williams (35)
| Antawn Jamison, Anthony Parker (6)
| Mo Williams (10)
| United Center21,707
| 61–18
|- align="center" bgcolor="#ffcccc"
| 80
| April 9
| Indiana
| 
| J. J. Hickson, Sebastian Telfair (21)
| J. J. Hickson (10)
| Delonte West (12)
| Quicken Loans Arena20,562
| 61–19
|- align="center" bgcolor="#ffcccc"
| 81
| April 11
| Orlando
| 
| Delonte West (21)
| Žydrūnas Ilgauskas (12)
| Mo Williams (9)
| Quicken Loans Arena20,562
| 61–20
|- align="center" bgcolor="#ffcccc"
| 82
| April 14
| @ Atlanta
| 
| Jamario Moon (15)
| Jamario Moon (7)
| Sebastian Telfair (5)
| Philips Arena19,069
| 61–21
|-

Playoffs

|- align="center" bgcolor="#ccffcc"
| 1
| April 17
| Chicago
| W 96–83
| LeBron James (24)
| Anderson Varejão (15)
| Mo Williams (10)
| Quicken Loans Arena20,562
| 1–0
|- align="center" bgcolor="#ccffcc"
| 2
| April 19
| Chicago
| W 112–102
| LeBron James (40)
| LeBron James (8)
| LeBron James (8)
| Quicken Loans Arena20,562
| 2–0
|- align="center" bgcolor="#ffcccc"
| 3
| April 22
| @ Chicago
| L 106–108
| LeBron James (39)
| Antawn Jamison (11)
| LeBron James (8)
| United Center22,991
| 2–1
|- align="center" bgcolor="#ccffcc"
| 4
| April 25
| @ Chicago
| W 121–98
| LeBron James (37)
| LeBron James (12)
| LeBron James (11)
| United Center22,991
| 3–1
|- align="center" bgcolor="#ccffcc"
| 5
| April 27
| Chicago
| W 96–94
| Antawn Jamison (25)
| LeBron James (10)
| LeBron James (9)
| Quicken Loans Arena20,562
| 4–1
|-

|- align="center" bgcolor="#ccffcc"
| 1
| May 1
| Boston
| W 101–93
| LeBron James (35)
| Antawn Jamison (9)
| LeBron James (7)
| Quicken Loans Arena20,562
| 1–0
|- align="center" bgcolor="#ffcccc"
| 2
| May 3
| Boston
| L 86–104
| LeBron James (24)
| James, Varejão (7)
| Mo Williams (7)
| Quicken Loans Arena20,562
| 1–1
|- align="center" bgcolor="#ccffcc"
| 3
| May 7
| @ Boston
| W 124–95
| LeBron James (38)
| Antawn Jamison (12)
| James, Williams (7)
| TD Garden18,624
| 2–1
|- align="center" bgcolor="#ffcccc"
| 4
| May 9
| @ Boston
| L 87–97
| LeBron James (22)
| LeBron James (9)
| LeBron James (8)
| TD Garden18,624
| 2–2
|- align="center" bgcolor="#ffcccc"
| 5
| May 11
| Boston
| L 88–120
| Shaquille O'Neal (21)
| Anderson Varejão (8)
| LeBron James (7)
| Quicken Loans Arena20,562
| 2–3
|- align="center" bgcolor="#ffcccc"
| 6
| May 13
| @ Boston
| L 85–94
| LeBron James (27)
| LeBron James (19)
| LeBron James (10)
| TD Garden18,624
| 2–4
|-

Player statistics

Regular season

Stats with the Cavaliers
1Did not start or finish the season with the Cavs.

Playoffs

Awards,  Records and Milestones

Awards
 LeBron James – NBA Most Valuable Player (2x)
 LeBron James – All-NBA First Team (4x)
 LeBron James – NBA All-Defensive First Team (2x)
 Anderson Varejão – NBA All-Defensive Second Team (1x)

Week/Month
 LeBron James – Player of the Week (6x)
 LeBron James – Player of the Month (4x)
 Mike Brown – Coach of the Month (December)

All-Star
 LeBron James –  NBA All-Star Game Selection (6x)

Records
 December 2, 2009: Zydrunas Ilgauskas set the record for most games played as a Cavalier with 771 and moved into third place on the Cavaliers' all-time scoring list behind LeBron James and Brad Daugherty.
 On March 19, 2010, LeBron James set a record as the youngest player in NBA history to record 15,000 career points.
 At the end of the season, LeBron James was the all-time scoring leader of the Cavs, with 15,251 points.

Team Records
 On May 11, the Cavaliers suffered their worst playoffs defeat, against the Boston Celtics, by a margin of 32 points, 88-120.
 On December 23, the Cavaliers set a franchise record and tied with the NBA record of fewest points allowed in an OT period, against Sacramento Kings.

Milestones
 Daniel Gibson reached 200 career games and 5,000 minutes.*
 Danny Green played his first season in the NBA.*
 J.J. Hickson reached 100 career games and 2,000 minutes.*
 Zydrunas Ilgauskas reached 21,000 minutes and 4,000 field goals made.*
 LeBron James reached 15,000 career points, 500 career games, 22,000 minutes, 5,000 field goals made, 11,000 field goals attempted, 2,000 three-point shots attempted, 3,000 defensives rebounds, 1,000 fouls and 2,000 Playoffs points.*
 Cedric Jackson played his first season in the NBA.*
 Antawn Jamison reached 17,000 career points and 31,000 minutes.
 Jamario Moon reached 200 career games, 5,000 minutes and 1,000 rebounds.
 Shaquille O'Neal reached 41,000 minutes, 11,000 field goals made, 19,000 field goals attempted, 11,000 free-throws attempted, 3,000 assists and 4,000 fouls.
 Anthony Parker reached 300 career games, 10,000 minutes, 1,000 three-point shots attempted, 1,000 defensives rebounds, 1,000 rebounds and 3,000 career points.
 Leon Powe reached 200 career games.
 Anderson Varejão reached 9,000 minutes, 1,000 field goals made, 2,000 field goals attempted, 1,000 free throws attempted and 1,000 fouls.*
 Delonte West reached 10,000 minutes, 3,000 field goals attempted and 1,000 rebounds.
 Mo Williams reached 14,000 minutes, 5,000 field goals attempted, 1,000 free-throws attempted, 2,000 assists, 1,000 turnovers and 6,000 points.

*Spent the entire NBA Career with the Cleveland Cavaliers, until reach these Milestones.

Team Milestones
 On December 30, the Cavs reached 3,200 regular seasons games, against the Atlanta Hawks.
 On February 4, the Cavs reached 1,500 regular seasons victories against the Miami Heat.
 On April 14, the Cavs reached 1,800 combined regular and post-seasons defeats, against the Atlanta Hawks
 On May 7, the Cavs reached 70 post-season wins, against the Boston Celtics.
 The Cavaliers reached 30 playoff series, against the Boston Celtics.

Injuries, Surgeries, and Absences
 Leon Powe – Knee surgery (before arriving Cleveland)
 Jamario Moon – Abdominal (Side) Injury
 Mo Williams – Left Shoulder Injury
 Anderson Varejão – Left Hamstring Injury
 Shaquille O'Neal – Right Thumb Surgery
 LeBron James – Right Elbow Injury

Transactions

Free agents

Additions

Subtractions

Trades

On February 17, the Cavaliers completed a three-team trade with the Washington Wizards and the Los Angeles Clippers, acquiring Antawn Jamison from Washington and Sebastian Telfair from L.A. The Cavs sent Zydrunas Ilgauskas to the Wizards, plus a first round draft pick in 2010 and the rights to Emir Preldžić.

On March 23, the Cavaliers re-signed Ilgauskas for the remainder of the season after his contract was bought out by the Wizards. The Cavaliers also waived Darnell Jackson to make room on the roster.

References

External links

Cleveland Cavaliers seasons
Cleveland
Cleveland Cavaliers
Cleveland Cavaliers